East Mountain is a mountain located in the Catskill Mountains of New York southeast of Sundown. Bangle Hill is located north-northeast and Pople Hill is located northeast of East Mountain.

References

Mountains of Ulster County, New York
Mountains of New York (state)